Swayze Waters (born May 18, 1987) is a gridiron football placekicker and punter who is currently a free agent. He was most recently a member of the Toronto Argonauts of the Canadian Football League (CFL). He was signed by the Detroit Lions of the National Football League (NFL) as an undrafted free agent in 2009. He played college football at UAB. He has also been a member of the Oakland Raiders, Pittsburgh Steelers, Edmonton Eskimos, Carolina Panthers, and BC Lions.

Early years
Waters attended Jackson Preparatory School in Jackson, Mississippi, where he played kicker, wide receiver and punter. He was his team's leading receiver for three years. He was named all-state selection his senior year. His senior year, he was voted team Most Valuable Player. That year, he had 35 catches, 813 yards and 10 touchdowns and 14 field goals. He also participated in baseball and track.

College career
His college major was Business Management. In 2005, as a freshman, Waters was the kick off specialist. He was named to Conference USA Commissioner's Honor Roll. In 2006, as a sophomore, he was a kick off specialist and a "Long Field goal specialist". In 2007, as a Junior, he kicked and punted. He was named a finalist for the Lou Groza Award. He was also named first-team All-Conference USA by media and a second-team selection by conference's head coaches. He made 22-of-28 field goals during the season, including being 8-for-10 from 40-49 and 3-of-4 for 50-plus yards. In one game against Alcorn State, he kicked 5 field goals which set UAB single-game record. He had an average of 41.4 yards per punt.

Professional career

Detroit Lions
Waters was signed by the Detroit Lions as an undrafted free agent following the 2009 NFL draft. He was cut from the team, only to be re-signed in August. He was waived/injured on August 26 when the team signed placekicker Billy Cundiff.

Oakland Raiders
Waters was signed by the Oakland Raiders on April 13, 2010.  On September 4, 2010, Waters was released to free agent status by the Oakland Raiders.

Pittsburgh Steelers
Waters was signed by the Pittsburgh Steelers on February 10, 2011. He was released on September 2.

Edmonton Eskimos
Waters was signed by the Edmonton Eskimos (CFL) on June 24, 2012, and then released on July 10.

Toronto Argonauts
On July 15, 2012, Waters was signed by the Toronto Argonauts (CFL) as an injury replacement for starting kicker Noel Prefontaine. The Argos would go on to win the 100th Grey Cup at the end of the 2012 season, with Waters' serving as the team's placekicker as Noel Prefontaine had returned to handle the punting duties. He won the John Agro Special Teams Award for being named the CFL's Most Outstanding Special Teams Player in 2014.

Carolina Panthers
On February 11, 2016, Waters was signed by the Carolina Panthers. He was waived on August 15, 2016.

BC Lions
On February 7, 2017, it was announced that Waters had signed with the BC Lions (CFL). He was recovering from an injury to start the 2017 CFL season, while rookie Ty Long assumed the kicking duties. After Long performed well in the first three games, Waters was released on July 12, 2017.

Edmonton Eskimos
Waters was signed by the Edmonton Eskimos on September 25, 2017. He played in five games for the Eskimos, making 11 of 15 field goal attempts and 12 of 14 one-point converts.

Toronto Argonauts (II)
Upon entering free agency, Waters signed with the Toronto Argonauts on February 14, 2018 to a one-year deal. However, Waters was released by the Argos on June 6, 2018, partway through the preseason.

Personal life
Swayze Waters is the son of Susan and Joel Waters and is married to Kendal Carr Waters. Contrary to a popular rumor, Waters is not named after actor Patrick Swayze. His grandmother's maiden name was "Swayze" and that is for whom he is named.

He appeared in the third season of the TV series Undrafted on NFL Network, which aired in 2016. The series follows Waters as he leaves his punting job in the CFL in order to chase after his dream of being a punter in the NFL.

References

External links
UAB Blazers bio
Toronto Argonauts bio 

1987 births
Living people
American football placekickers
American football punters
American players of Canadian football
Canadian football placekickers
Canadian football punters
Detroit Lions players
Edmonton Elks players
Oakland Raiders players
Pittsburgh Steelers players
Players of American football from Jackson, Mississippi
Players of Canadian football from Jackson, Mississippi
Toronto Argonauts players
UAB Blazers football players
BC Lions players